The 600s decade ran from January 1, 600, to December 31, 609.

Significant people

References

Bibliography